Kaveh Boulevard is a boulevard in Northern Isfahan, Isfahan Province, Iran. Kaveh Terminal and Isfahan Urban and Suburban Railway Organization Headquarters is located along the boulevard. The boulevard is also currently the main entrance to the city from the North and Tehran, as Freeway towards Tehran terminates at the northern end of the boulevard.

Streets in Isfahan